Orlando Antonini (born 15 October 1944) is an Italian prelate of the Catholic Church who worked in the diplomatic service of the Holy See from 1980 to 2015, as an archbishop and apostolic nuncio from 1999 to 2015.

Biography
Orlando Antonini was born on 15 October 1944 in Villa Sant'Angelo, Province of L'Aquila, Italy. He was ordained a priest on 29 June 1968. He earned a doctorate in canon law. On 25 March 1980, he entered the diplomatic service of the Holy See. His early assignments took him to Bangladesh, Madagascar, Syria, Chile, the Netherlands, and France. He also worked in Rome at the Secretariat of State.

On 24 July 1999 Pope John Paul II appointed him Titular Archbishop of Formia and Apostolic Nuncio to both Zambia and Malawi. He received his episcopal consecration from Cardinal Angelo Sodano on 11 September 1999.

Pope Benedict XVI appointed him Apostolic Nuncio on 16 November 2005 to Paraguay, and on 8 August 2009 to the Apostolic Nuncio in Serbia.

He retired on 30 September 2015.

See also
 List of heads of the diplomatic missions of the Holy See

References

External links

 Catholic Hierarchy: Archbishop Orlando Antonini 

Apostolic Nuncios to Malawi
Apostolic Nuncios to Zambia
Apostolic Nuncios to Paraguay
Apostolic Nuncios to Serbia
1944 births
People from the Province of L'Aquila
Living people